is a train station located in Asakura, Fukuoka.

Lines
Nishi-Nippon Railroad
Amagi Line

Platforms

Adjacent stations

Surrounding area 
 Japan National Route 500
 Takei Clinic
 Mada Elementary School
 Mada Post Office
 Aeon Amagi Shopping Center
 Mada Nursery
 Kumano Shrine

Railway stations in Fukuoka Prefecture
Railway stations in Japan opened in 1921